Jean-Pierre Franque (1774–1860), a French painter, was born at Le Buis. He studied under David together with his twin brother Joseph, and excelled in historical subjects and portraiture, imitating the style of his master. He married Lucile Messageot, also an artist, who died in 1802, at the age of twenty-two years. Franque died in 1860, leaving among others the following works in the Versailles Gallery:

The Passage of the Rhine; after Le Brun. 1835.
The Siege of Lille; after Van der Meulen and Le Brun. 1836.
The Battle of Lens. 1841.

References

 

1774 births
1860 deaths
18th-century French painters
French male painters
19th-century French painters
People from Drôme
Pupils of Jacques-Louis David
18th-century French male artists